The CSIT – International Workers and Amateurs in Sports Confederation (also International Labour and Amateur Sports Confederation) (French: CSIT - Confédération Sportive Internationale Travailliste et Amateur, CSIT) is an international multi-sports organization. It was established as the successor to Socialist Workers' Sport International and as such celebrated its centenary in 2013. The core principles of contributing to physical activity and sports have stayed in its action policy: it is a right of men and women to do sports no matter what are their professionalism levels. The key concept of the CSIT's sport policy has always been "Sports for all". The policy stems from the historic ideas of the international worker sport movement.

International Workers and Amateurs in Sports Confederation - since 1913, recognized by IOC since 1986, member of GAISF since 1973.

The main activities of CSIT consist of organizing the major and small sports events for amateurs, more precisely CSIT World Sports Games and CSIT Single Championship. Sports events are considered as festivals of friendship, cultural exchange, events promoting awareness of tolerance, respect, unity, sustainability and fair play in sport environment.

Within the world of international sport, the CSIT maintains its support for everyone to benefit from sporting activities regardless of their qualifications, talent, nationality, age, sex and social background.

International Co-operation (ICO) 
The CSIT actually works in good co-operation with the IOC (International Olympic Committee), GAISF & SportAccord (United Sports Federations), ICSSPE (International Council of Sport and Physical Education), EFPM (European Fair Play Movement), ISCA (International Sport and Culture Association), WADA (World Anti-Doping Agency),  TAFISA (The Association for International Sport for All), FICEP (Fédération Internationale Catholique Education Physique et Sportive), AISTS (International Academy of Sport Science and Technology), IWG (International Working Group on Women and Sport), FICS (The International Federation of Sports Chiropractic), P.I. (Panathlon International) and ENGSO (European Non-Governmental Sports Organisation).

Activities 

The main fields of the CSIT activities are as follows:
 International Amateur in Sports Championships (CSIT World Sports Games).  The main activity of CSIT. The championships are not games for professional top athletes, but for all workers and amateurs from different countries and cultures all over the world. The main aim is not only to organize a sport competition, but also to gather sports friends as a worldwide family to bring about lifelong friendships, intercultural exchange and unity in sport. 
 CSIT Single Championships. Besides the World Sports Games, CSIT organises championships in single sports all over the world: beach volleyball, swimming, chess, tennis, etc.
 Sports for All Activities: Sports for Elderly People (Seniors 55+)   The task is to organize events also for elderly ones by gathering them to the following experiences: to  practice and discovery of specific sports and physical activities, the exchange of training programs and knowledge relating to these and the exchange about culture, tourism and way of life of each country. Sports for disabled people  Starting from World Sport Games 2021 in Cervia, CSIT has the intention to include the sports for disabled (for now only to demonstrate and promote). The strategy of implementing this is to merge the athletes without any disabilities together with disabled into teams, therefore fostering the idea of inclusion, unity and tolerance in sports. The pilot project will include futsal, basketball and volleyball.
 YOUAca  – Preparatory works for Youth Academy of Grassroots Sport. Currently, in sport organization at grassroots level, there are more adults and seniors than young people, who usually don’t have the real opportunity to improve their skills in order to build their path into the sport’s sector. From the other side, since there is a lack of young people sport organizations at the club level, at national level, but also at the European level, the policymakers are getting older and decision making becomes more bureaucratic. In order to improve the situation, the partnership of 4 National sports organisations coordinated by CSIT intends to put into place preparatory works for starting up the Academy of Grassroots Sport for Young Leaders. Currently, the YOUAca project is running on its second edition (YOUAca 2.0.) with 5 nations participating: Italy (AICS), Spain (UCEC), Croatia (Health Life Academy), Finland (TUL), Estonia (Kalev). In its third edition YOUAca is planned to be renamed to YOU.Lead.
Bridges - building integration and solidarity between "old" and "new" citizens (local inhabitants and immigrants from different countries). The main aim is to create inclusive local communities and enhance solidarity. This communication should create and foster a positive perception of migration (instead of existing "immigrants invasion" theory) and intercultural dialogue. The duration of the project is from January 2019 until June 2021 with Austria, Greece, Croatia, Italy and Spain participating.

Relevant activities and experiences 

The achievement of the following aims is the most important task of the CSIT:
 to  bring together workers and amateur sports organizations of the entire world and to promote the foundation of new organizations,
 to co-operate with international organizations with the same goals and values,
 to support member organizations with their tasks and activities in all the fields of sport and physical culture, also through agreements with international organizations and authorities,
 to promote all activities that aim to improve the practice of sports by human beings of two sexes considering their age and their physical aptitudes in order to protect and improve their health;
 to achieve the aims by respecting the amateur status of athletes, the values of amateurism and the educational values of sport,
 to encourage to practice sport and physical activity in nature while considering the protection of the environment,
 to use sport as a means to promote peace and mutual understanding among people and to contribute to development of the world of social associations at any level,
 to sustain cultural advancement and to improve health including psychophysical conditions of the member unions as well as its individual members.

Pillars 
The objectives of the CSIT are conducted in praxis by clearly defined pillars. They are the CSIT World Sports Games, the CSIT Single Championships, the International Tournaments, the International Festivals, the Sport for All-activities, the International Projects and the Health, Recreation and Fitness Activities, as well as EU-funded projects: YOUAca (Youth Academy of Grassroots Sport) and Bridges (intercultural exchange between old and new members of local communities).

Members 
The CSIT has the following members and candidates as of June 2021 :

Partners and networks 
 International Olympic Committee
 SportAccord
 International Council of Sport and Physical Education
 European Fair Play Movement
 International Sport and Culture Association
 World Anti-Doping Agency
 The Association for International Sport for All
 Fédération Internationale Catholique Education Physique et Sportive
 International Academy of Sport Science and Technology
 International Working Group on Women and Sport
 The International Federation of Sports Chiropractic
 Panathlon International
 European Non-Governmental Sports Organisation
 The International FXC - Fireball Extreme Challenge Federation

CSIT World Sports Games - A New Brand of the CSIT
The "World Sports Games" are the main highlight and a new Brand of the CSIT. It is a unique major sports event for thousands of workers and amateurs every two years where the incomparable "Spirit of CSIT" can be experienced. This experience started in 2008 in Rimini, Italy, and as of November 2020, already had 6 editions: in Italy, Estonia, Bulgaria, Latvia and Spain. The 7th edition of CSIT World Sports Games was to be held in Cervia, Italy. The games in 2021 were cancelled due to the safety reasons because of the world COVID-19 pandemic outbreak. The CSIT World Sports Games are the successor major sports events of the International Workers' Olympiads.

2017

Sports (2017)
15 official CSIT championships and 8 demonstration sport:

Individual Sports
  Athletics
  Swimming
  Wrestling
  Beach Wrestling
  Judo
  Table Tennis
  Tennis and Beach Tennis
  Chess
  Pétanque

Team Sports
  Football
  Mini Football
  Basketball 
  Beach volleyball
  Volleyball
  Mamanet

Demonstration Sports
 O-Sport
 Bowling 
 Wheel Gymnastics
 YOU.FO
 Street Workout
 Crossminton
 Darts
 Streetball (3 on 3)
 others : Spikeball, Kubb, Body Art, Zumba, Capoeira, Arm wrestling, Table hockey, Kendo, Lacrosse, Croquet, Archery, Novuss, Orienteering, Karate (All Style), Sambo.

2019

Individual Sports
  Athletics
  Swimming
  Wrestling
  Beach Wrestling
  Judo
  Karate
  Table Tennis
  Tennis and Beach Tennis
  Chess
  Pétanque

Team Sports
  Football
  Mini Football
  Basketball 
  Beach volleyball
  Volleyball
  Mamanet

CSIT Partner Championships
Pole Dance , Mini Golf , Wheel Gym , American Football , Skating , Dancing , Fistball , Handball.

Medals
Results:

See also
World Corporate Games
World Company Games
European Company Games
World Firefighters Games
World Military Games
World Police and Fire Games

References

External links
CSIT home page

International sports organizations
Multi-sport events
Trade unions
Sports organizations established in 1946
Politics and sports
Workers' sport